Klaus Täuber (born 17 January 1958) is a German retired professional footballer who played for SpVgg Erlangen, 1. FC Nürnberg, Stuttgarter Kickers, FC Schalke 04, and Bayer 04 Leverkusen. His brothers – Jürgen and Stephan – were also professional footballers.

External links
 

1958 births
Living people
Sportspeople from Erlangen
German footballers
Association football forwards
Bundesliga players
2. Bundesliga players
1. FC Nürnberg players
Stuttgarter Kickers players
FC Schalke 04 players
Bayer 04 Leverkusen players
German football managers
SSV Jahn Regensburg managers
SC Westfalia Herne managers
Schwarz-Weiß Essen managers
UEFA Cup winning players
VfB Hüls managers
Footballers from Bavaria
20th-century German people
21st-century German people
West German footballers